Gabriel Costa França (born 14 March 1995), simply known as Gabriel, is a Brazilian professional footballer who plays for Yokohama FC as a central defender.

Career
Gabriel was born in Pedro Leopoldo, Minas Gerais, and joined Atlético Mineiro's youth setup in 2005. He made his senior debut for the club on 8 February 2014, starting in a 2–0 Campeonato Mineiro away loss against Tupi.

Gabriel subsequently returned to the under-20 squad, and was promoted to the first team ahead of the 2016 season. He made his Série A debut on 14 May of that year by starting in a 1–0 home win against Santos.

Gabriel became a regular starter for the club in September 2016, and scored his first professional goal on 23 November of that year, in a 3–1 home loss against Grêmio in the 2016 Copa do Brasil Finals.

On 3 January 2019, Gabriel was sent on a two-year loan to Botafogo. He, however, rejoined Atlético at the start of 2020.

On 13 July 2021, Gabriel agreed to a permanent deal with Yokohama FC. Gabriel became a captain team on 5 February 2023.

Career statistics

Club
.

Honours
Atlético Mineiro
Campeonato Mineiro: 2017, 2020, 2021

References

External links
Atletico official profile 

1995 births
Living people
Sportspeople from Minas Gerais
People from Pedro Leopoldo
Brazilian footballers
Association football defenders
Campeonato Brasileiro Série A players
J1 League players
J2 League players
Clube Atlético Mineiro players
Botafogo de Futebol e Regatas players
Yokohama FC players
Brazilian expatriate footballers
Brazilian expatriate sportspeople in Japan
Expatriate footballers in Japan